Cameron is a town in Moore County, North Carolina,  United States. The population was 359 at the 2020 census.

History
Cameron grew up around a plank road that was followed in later years by a railroad. The town was planned in 1875 and incorporated in 1876. Cameron was at the end of the Raleigh and Augusta Railroad. Its location made it an ideal place for entrepreneurs to establish businesses. They built turpentine distilleries, established mercantile and hotel businesses to serve the needs of the railroad's customers and built a thriving dewberry farming and consignment operation.

Geography
Cameron is located at  (35.326096, -79.253159).

Neighboring towns include Vass to the south and Carthage to the west.

Demographics

At the 2000 census there were 151 people, 66 households, and 41 families living in the town. The population density was 143.8 people per square mile (55.5/km). There were 78 housing units at an average density of 74.3 per square mile (28.7/km).  The racial makeup of the town was 64.90% White and 35.10% Black.
Of the 66 households 25.8% had children under the age of 18 living with them, 40.9% were married couples living together, 18.2% had a female householder with no husband present, and 36.4% were non-families. 31.8% of households were one person and 16.7% were one person aged 65 or older. The average household size was 2.29 and the average family size was 2.88.

The age distribution was 17.9% under the age of 18, 9.9% from 18 to 24, 30.5% from 25 to 44, 20.5% from 45 to 64, and 21.2% 65 or older. The median age was 42 years. For every 100 females, there were 75.6 males. For every 100 females age 18 and over, there were 82.4 males.

The median household income was $32,500 and the median family income  was $41,964. Males had a median income of $32,917 versus $22,500 for females. The per capita income for the town was $15,337. There were 17.9% of families and 21.3% of the population living below the poverty line, including 13.5% of those under eighteen and 45.8% of those over 64.

Notable people
 Jeff Hardy, professional wrestler
 Matt Hardy, professional wrestler
 Shannon Moore, professional wrestler
 Trevor Lee, professional wrestler

References

External links
 Historical information at the Cameron Antique Dealers Association website.
 Moore County Chamber of Commerce

Towns in North Carolina
Towns in Moore County, North Carolina
Populated places established in 1875
1875 establishments in North Carolina